

Qualification system
A total of 156 fencers qualified to compete at the games. Each nation could enter a team of up to eighteen fencers (a team consisting of three athletes in each event). A maximum of two fencers per country could be entered in the individual events, and one team in the team events. All qualification were done at the 2015 Pan American Championships, where the top 7 teams plus two individuals in each event will qualify. Hosts Canada were automatically qualified with a full team of 18 athletes. All nations qualifying in a team event, could enter only 2 athletes in the individual event.

Qualification timeline

Qualification summary

Men

Épée

Foil

Sabre

Women

Épée

Foil

Sabre

References

External links
2015 Pan American Championships results

P
Qualification for the 2015 Pan American Games
Fencing at the 2015 Pan American Games